Brigitte Alexander (9 October 1911 - 10 May 1995) was a German-born Mexican author, actress, director and translator. When the Nazi party seized power in Germany, she fled to France. Facing arrest in France, her husband chose to enter the Foreign Legion. Assisted by friends and Albert Einstein, the family made their way to Mexico. Alexander, who spoke five languages, worked as a translator for UNESCO and Amnesty International, and performed in movies and plays in Mexico.

Biography
Brigitte Kaufmann was born on 9 October 1911 in Stuttgart, Germany into a Jewish family. Her father was in the military and during her childhood they moved to Berlin, where she completed high school. Her studies focused on the classics and she wrote her thesis on Friedrich Hölderlin. She learned German, Spanish, French, Greek, Latin and English and later, due to her extensive knowledge of language, was employed as a translator for UNESCO and Amnesty International.

She began university in Berlin in 1932, but then transferred to the University of Frankfurt. During a trip to Austria with her Aryan boyfriend, news broke that Hitler had won power and he left her to return to Germany. She fled to Paris in early 1933. In France, Kaufmann worked as an actress, under the name of Brigitte Châtel and translated documents. She met her future husband, Alfred Alexander-Katz in Paris, and they married in 1939; the following day, her husband was taken to a concentration camp. He was given the choice of being interned in a labor camp or joining the Foreign Legion and chose the latter. Their oldest child, Didier, was born in France, Alexander was sent to Clermont-Ferrand and the family relocated. In 1942, a telegram advised the young family that Albert Einstein and Rudolph Uhlman, a lawyer in New York, had secured visas through Ambassador Gilberto Bosques for them to escape to Veracruz, Mexico aboard the ship San Thomé.

Once they had arrived in Mexico City, Alexander began acting. Her career came about by accident; having gone to see a performance by Anita and Isabelita Blanch she commented on the performance in French. The man setting next to her asked if she was French and if she could act. She replied in the affirmative and secured her first job from him, playwright Rodolfo Usigli. Later she became a regular performer at poetry recitals at the Heinrich Heine club and cabaret theatre. Soon her twins, Susana and Roberto were born and Alexander became a widow, doing whatever she needed to do to make ends meet: breeding pigs, selling silk, selling hearing aids, and acting.

She wrote the monologue "The Return", and, in 1951, produced the first Mexican telenovela, adapted from a drama by Cuban writer Félix B. Caignet, Angeles de la Calle which ran from March 1952 to July 1955 and was sponsored by the Lotería Nacional. She became the first woman in Mexico to produce and direct television programs and she was then asked to help structure the programming for Channel 11.

Alexander died on 10 May 1995 in Mexico City.

Selected works

Publishing
Monograph:
 El retorno, in: Stefano, Giovanni di/Peters, Michaela (Hrsg.): México com punto de fuga real o imaginario. Munich: Meidenbauer, 301-304. 

Theater plays:
 “La Opera de los tres centavos”
 “Fiesta teatral” (1946)
 “El Proceso” (1953)
 “El Médico a la fuerza” (1954)
 “Cómo ser una buena madre judía” (1979)

Filmography
Film:
 Redondo (1986)
 Macho y hembras (1987)
 Fragmentos de un cuerpo (1988)
 Barroco (1989)
 Contigo en la distancia (1991) Mamá de Jose
 Como agua para chocolate (1992) Tía Mary
 Miroslava (1993)  Abuela de Miroslava
 Ámbar (1994)  Madre Kluzki … aka Amber
 Perfume, efecto inmediato (1994)
    
Television:
 La Hora Marcada (1990) 
 Cultura en movimiento (1993) (documentary)

Television writing/producing:
 Los Cuentos de Pepito (1951) TV series
 Ángeles de la calle (1952) TV series

References

External links
 Literature from and about Brigitte Alexander in the catalog of the German National Library
 Literature from and about Brigitte Alexander in the catalog of the Ibero-American Institute Prussian Cultural Heritage, Berlin 
 Information about Brigitte Alexander in the French National Archives

1911 births
1995 deaths
Actresses from Stuttgart
Jewish emigrants from Nazi Germany to France
German emigrants to Mexico
Mexican television directors
Mexican women writers
Mexican film actresses
Mexican television actresses
20th-century German women writers
20th-century German non-fiction writers
20th-century German translators
Women television directors